Clark Randy Dickens is an American football coach.  He is currently an assistant coach at Quincy Senior High School in Quincy, Illinois. In 1986, he became the new head coach at Quincy University, which had previously disbanded football in 1953. Dickens remained at Quincy until 1990, compiling a career record of 25–22–1.

Dickens is the son of former Wofford, Wyoming and Indiana head coach Phil Dickens.

Head coaching record

References

Year of birth missing (living people)
Living people
Indiana Hoosiers football coaches
Quincy Hawks football coaches
Rose–Hulman Fightin' Engineers football coaches
High school football coaches in Illinois